O-phosphoseryl-tRNA(Sec) selenium transferase is an enzyme that in humans is encoded by the SEPSECS gene.

References

Further reading